Lizard Lick Towing is an improvised American reality television series. It is filmed in the style of cinéma vérité, and the network behind the show, truTV, state that their series "feature real-life situations," unlike other reality shows "which often involve contests or other highly staged events." The show is a spin-off of the truTV series All Worked Up, and follows Ron Shirley, his wife Amy, Bobby Brantley, and their team of repossession agents in Wendell, North Carolina (the town that has jurisdiction over the Lizard Lick unincorporated area).

, 91 episodes of Lizard Lick Towing have aired, the most recent season ending in late 2014.

Series overview

Episodes

Season 1 (2011)

Season 2 (2011–12)

Season 3 (2013)

Season 4 (2013–14)

References

External links
 
 Lizard Lick Towing on TruTV

Lists of American non-fiction television series episodes